Parks in Greater St. Louis are administered by a variety of state, county, and municipal authorities. The region also is home to Gateway Arch National Park, site of the Gateway Arch, the only National Memorial in the state of Missouri.

Parks in the city of St. Louis
Parks are administered by the city of St. Louis Department of Parks, Recreation and Forestry, the National Park Service, or a separate private board, such as Tower Grove Park, which is maintained by a Board of Commissioners but remains city property. Compton Hill Reservoir Park is owned by the city but maintained by the St. Louis Water Division.

Non-municipally owned parks
The city of St. Louis is also home to several public parks that are owned by other entities. Among these is Baer Plaza, owned and maintained by CVC/Sports Authority, Gateway Arch National Park, owned and maintained by the National Park Service, Kiel Triangle Park, owned by the Bi-State Development Agency, and Luther Ely Smith Park, owned and maintained by the National Park Service.

Parks in St. Louis County
St. Louis County owns and maintains more than forty parks, including playgrounds and nature preserves. It also operates several recreation centers, the National Museum of Transportation, and the Affton Community Center. In addition to parks owned by St. Louis County, several municipalities in the county also own and maintain their own park systems.

Parks in St. Charles County

St. Charles County Blueways 
The Dardenne Creek Blueway is the first in a planned series of kayaking and canoeing routes connecting St. Charles area parks and recreation facilities. The blueway’s first 3.5-mile stretch links Riverside Landing County Park on the Mississippi River to St. Peters’ 370 Lakeside Park and takes up to two hours for a round trip. The next stage opens in the fall of 2022 and will link to St. Peters’ Lone Wolff Park 5.2-miles to the southwest. Three future phases will connect Jack Gettemeyer Park, O’Fallon Sports Park, and Bluebird Meadow Park for a total of 19-miles (30.6 km) of access along Dardenne Creek. A future route is the Big Creek Blueway, which will connect Indian Camp Creek and Flatwoods parks through Big Creek and the Cuivre River, or about 12.3-miles (19.8 km).

State parks
Eleven Missouri state parks are in Greater St. Louis, and the Missouri Department of Natural Resources also operates several state historic sites in the region.

References

External links
 St. Louis City Parks Division
 List of St. Louis City Parks
 St. Louis Amusement Parks of the past

St. Louis